Saint Werenfried (or Werenfrid, Werenfridus; died ) was an English Benedictine monk, priest and missionary among the Frisians.
His intercession is thought to relieve the pain of arthritis and to help gardeners.
His feast day is 14 August.

Life

Werenfried was a Benedictine monk.
He was probably born in Northumbria and spent time in Ireland before becoming a missionary.
He worked with Saint Willibrord of Echternach to convert the Frisians to Christianity.
He died around 780 at Arnhem, what is now the Netherlands.
His coffin was placed in a boat that was washed down the Rhine and came to rest in Elst.
The Overbetuwe municipal coat of arms depicts this event.

The tomb of St. Werenfried in the 8th century church in what is now Elst attracted pilgrims who wanted release from arthritic pain, or who wanted to become better gardeners.
The church where Werenfridus was originally buried has been called Werenfriduskerk since 1483. 
In 1944 the original Werenfriduskerk was destroyed, but after the Second World War the church was rebuilt. 
Today a small museum has been set up under the church , because the church appears to have been built on two large Gallo-Roman temples.

Monks of Ramsgate account

The monks of St Augustine's Abbey, Ramsgate, wrote in their Book of Saints (1921),

Butler's account

The hagiographer Alban Butler ( 1710–1773) wrote in his Lives of the Fathers, Martyrs, and Other Principal Saints, under November 7,

O'Hanlon's account

John O'Hanlon (1821–1905) in his Lives of the Irish saints wrote,

Notes

Sources

 

 

 

Northumbrian saints
780 deaths